The 2021 Liga 3 Banten (also known as Liga 3 MS Glow For Men PSSI Banten for sponsorship reason) will be the sixth season of Liga 3 Banten as a qualifying round for the national round of the 2021–22 Liga 3.

Persikota Tangerang were the defending champion.

Teams
There are 22 teams participated in the league this season.

First round

Group A

Group B

Group C

Group D

Second round

Group E

Grup F

Knockout stage

Semi-finals

Third place play-off

Finals

References

Liga 3
Liga 3 (Indonesia) seasons
Sport in Banten